Arkalgud, also known as Arakalagudu  is a panchayat town and is one among the eight taluks of Hassan district in the state of Karnataka, India. It is situated 30 km from Hassan, 181 km from Mangalore and 195 km from Bangalore. The river Hemavati forms the entire northern boundary of the Taluk; river Kaveri runs through a portion of the south. It is well connected by road to many towns and cities of Karnataka. Hassan Junction railway station is the nearest major railway station and Kannur International Airport is the nearest airport at 150 kilometres.

History
It is said that Gautama rishi performed penance to Surya(Sun God) and installed the idol of Arkeshwara, the presiding deity of the local Arkeshwara temple and the town was originally called Arkapuri (city of an image of Arkeshwara, the presiding deity). Hence the name Arkalgud came into existence. It was founded by Krishnappa Nayaka, one of the Aigur (Balam) chiefs in 1568 A.D. It was then captured by Kanthirava Narasaraja I of Mysore in 1647 A.D., it was retaken subsequently by Keladi Shivappa Nayaka of Ikkeri and finally in 1694 by Chikkadevaraja Wodeyar (1673–1704) of Mysore.

Geography and salient features
It lies partly in semi-malnad and partly in maidan tract. It occupies sixth place in the District in terms of  geographical area. The soil is red sandy derived from granites, gneiss and schists. The soil is red to brownish in colour, shallow to fairly deep shallow, loamy to sandy loamy in texture intermixed with fairly large amounts of coarse gravel and pebbles. They are well drained but poor in bases and water holding capacity. It is favourable for growing crops like paddy, sugarcane, coconut, potato, vegetables and plantation crops under irrigated conditions. It is suitable for growing ragi, millets, pulses, groundnut,  potato and maize under rain-fed conditions. The river Kaveri enters at Kodavinahosahalli, a village in the south of Arkalgud and flows only through a small portion of about 24 km and enters Mysore district. An Anicut called Krishnarajakatte has been constructed across the river in the Taluk from which two channels viz. Kattepura channel and Ramanathapura channel take off for a length of about 24 km and 30 km respectively. The Kattepura channel runs along the south bank, past Rudrapatna; and the Ramanathapura Channel along the north bank past Konnanur and Ramanathapura to Basavapatna. The river Hemavati divides Arakalgud and Hassan taluks. The river enters in Honnathapura in the western side and flows towards to east and enters Holenarasipura taluk. The  taluk receives rainfall from south-west monsoon. This taluk enjoys dry and cold climate during the year as the central part of the Taluk borders the Malenadu region and south-eastern portions form the southern maidan region. One can find some low hilly regions in the taluk as well as high altitude region such as Hippi-betta (3486 ft. or 1063 meters) in the western portion of the taluk. Konanur is the largest village in the taluk Basavapatna is one of the other village of Arakalgud taluk and Lakshmikanthaswamy temple is situated and Ramanathapura temples are famous in the same taluk every year one month jatra will be celebrated here.

Demographics
 India census, Arkalgud had a population of 15,184. Males constitute 51% of the population and females 49%. Arkalgud has an average literacy rate of 65%, higher than the national average of 59.5%; with 57% of the males and 43% of females literate. 12% of the population is under 6 years of age.

Gallery

References

Cities and towns in Hassan district